Freddi Fish 3: The Case of the Stolen Conch Shell is a 1998 video game and the third of five adventure games in the Freddi Fish series of games developed and published by Humongous Entertainment. An iOS version was released with a shortened title Freddi Fish & the Stolen Shell, and also released with a "Lite" demo version that featured subtitles and text boxes in the gameplay. It was considered one of Atari's capital projects available on its website and on the App Store. A Nintendo Switch version along with Putt-Putt Travels Through Time was released on January 3, 2022, followed by the PlayStation 4 version on the PlayStation Store on November 2.

Development
Development for the game began around April 1996. All puzzles were drafted by the development team on notebooks and minigames for the carnival were sketched. While programming the game, programmers used pseudo-code to keep track of their work.

The characters were designed from basic descriptions with 10 till 30 sketches drawn until a final sketch was approved. The longest process in the character animation was adding bubble trails to their movement. During the storyboard process it took from 15 to 30 sketches to design each scene in the game. Backgrounds were penciled, inked and hand painted. Some of those backgrounds were inspired by scenery photographs. To find the right voices for the characters, dozens of actors auditioned for the game.

Plot
Freddi and Luther are taking a summer vacation to the Founder's Day Festival in the Hawaiian Sea. They find that the Conch Shell which is used to signal the beginning of the festival has been stolen. The shell is vital to the festival which can't start without it. To make matters worse, Luther's Uncle Blenny, the "Grand Exalted Keeper of the Conch", is in jail, having been framed for the theft. He tasks Freddi and Luther with finding the three golden pipes that fell out and tracking the real thief. They search and investigate the suspicious characters to find out who really did it. Once all the pipes are found, Old Soggy, Uncle Blenny's dogfish, will smell the scent and find the culprit. Freddi and Luther follow Old Soggy to an Aztec temple in the Sea off the Coast of Mexico.

In the Aztec temple, they spot the thief with a bag and the conch shell. Old Soggy swims off to catch him. Luther takes interest in a jewel and grabs it, locking the temple's gate and getting himself trapped in a cage. Freddi has to get the key to unlock it. After Freddi frees Luther, the gate opens, and the bag drops into the temple. They catch the bag and tell everyone that Uncle Blenny is innocent. Inside the bag is one of six items: a microphone, a foreign language world map, a boxing glove, a cane, a spool of thread, or a toothbrush. The suspect for the theft depends on what the item is. When the suspect is chosen, they don't believe Freddi and Luther, but Old Soggy bites them from behind. The culprit confesses and explains the whole situation.

After the culprit gives Uncle Blenny the conch shell, everyone apologizes to him for blaming him. He forgives the town and has his title of "Grand Exalted Keeper of the Conch" reinstated. Luther places the pipes in the shell and Uncle Blenny blows out the signal to open the festival and everyone celebrates. The dialogue shows what will happen to the thief, then says, "case closed."

There are six possible suspects: Gill Barker, Claw, Nadine the Narwal, Rosy Pearl, Pierre the Tailor, and Horst Fedders the Tourist. Each one has a different reason for stealing the Conch Shell.

Gameplay
The game uses exactly the same mechanics as its predecessors. In each playthrough, the puzzles, collectible and usable items, character encounters, locations, minigames, and trivial click spots change to randomly determine which of the six suspects stole the Conch Shell.

Reception
Freddi Fish 3 was generally well-received, getting scores of 85% from GameBlitz, a 4-star rating from Allgame, 81% from Greenman Gaming, an Excellent rating from About this Particular Macintosh, 4 out of 10 from GameCola and a 5.5 out 10 score from Unikgamer.

References

External links
 
 Freddi Fish 3: The Case of the Stolen Conch Shell at Humongous Entertainment

1998 video games
Humongous Entertainment games
Infogrames games
Adventure games
Android (operating system) games
IOS games
Linux games
Classic Mac OS games
Nintendo Switch games
ScummVM-supported games
Video games featuring female protagonists
Windows games
Point-and-click adventure games
Video games developed in the United States
Single-player video games
Video games with alternate endings
Children's educational video games
Detective video games
Video games with underwater settings
Tommo games
UFO Interactive Games games